Marguerite Moreau (born April 25, 1977) is an American actress. She is known for her role as Jesse Reeves in the fantasy horror film Queen of the Damned, Katie in the comedy Wet Hot American Summer, and her role as Connie in The Mighty Ducks series of films. She has also made appearances on the popular television series Smallville, Lost, Cupid and The O.C.

Life and career
Moreau was born on April 25, 1977 in Riverside, California. Her first break-out role was playing the recurring part of Melanie on Blossom in 1994 and 1995. She guest starred in several TV series such as Boy Meets World and 3rd Rock from the Sun. As a child actress, she appeared in the Mighty Ducks films playing Connie Moreau.  After graduating from Vassar College with her B.A. in political science in 1999, she landed some of her most prominent roles.

In 2001, she starred as Katie in Wet Hot American Summer. She reprised the role in the prequel Wet Hot American Summer: First Day of Camp (2015) and the sequel Wet Hot American Summer: Ten Years Later (2017), both eight-part series produced by Netflix.

Moreau played the role of Jesse in the 2002 film Queen of the Damned, based on the Anne Rice novels. She played the lead role in the TV miniseries Firestarter: Rekindled, succeeding Drew Barrymore in the role of Charlie McGee. In 2003's Runaway Jury she played opposite Gene Hackman. Moreau also starred in the 2003 independent film Easy, which has also been broadcast on the Showtime cable television network.

Returning to television, she starred as Susan Atkins in Helter Skelter, a television movie about Charles Manson, and had a regular role on the ABC network series Life As We Know It in the 2004–2005 season. She played Monica Young, a high school teacher having an affair with one of her students.

Moreau appeared in a season two episode of Lost, playing Starla in "Everybody Hates Hugo", as well as several episodes of The O.C., playing Reed Carlson. Originally, she was to have a regular role in the Fox show Killer Instinct, but her character was written out of the series after the first episode and was replaced by the character played by Kristin Lehman. She has also appeared as a recurring character on the ABC series What About Brian.

She also appeared in a season 2 episode of Mad Men as a call girl named Vicky.

In 2008, she was in The Uninvited as an agoraphobic woman whose house torments her with malevolent spirits.

In 2009, she guest starred in the pilot episode of the series Cupid where she helps an Irish man find his "love at first sight".  She also made an appearance in the Monk episode "Mr. Monk and the Dog", and episodes of Private Practice, HawthoRNe, and CSI: NY.

She also had a minor role in the 2008 comedy Beverly Hills Chihuahua.

In 2010, she guest starred in two episodes of Brothers & Sisters and had a recurring role on the first season of the NBC show Parenthood. Her last appearance in Parenthood was in episode 5 of season one after she dumped Crosby. The same year, she appeared in several webisodes of a Jersey Shore parody in the format of Masterpiece Theatre, alongside YouTube comedian Ceciley Jenkins. Titled Mashterpiece Theatre Presents Jersey Shore, the series presented verbatim dialogue re-enacted by Moreau, Jenkins and Lisa Nova in aristocratic English accents while taking tea.

In 2011, she guest starred in American series Shameless as Linda, and in "I'm a Liver Not a Fighter" (episode 47 or episode 7 of season 4) of In Plain Sight. In 2013, she guest starred on Grey's Anatomy.

Personal life
Moreau married actor Christopher Redman in May 2010. In July 2015, Moreau gave birth to a son.

Filmography

Film

Television

References

External links 

1977 births
20th-century American actresses
21st-century American actresses
Actresses from California
American child actresses
American film actresses
American television actresses
Living people
Actresses from Riverside, California
Vassar College alumni